Manfred Oettl Reyes (born October 23, 1993 in Germany) is an alpine skier born in Germany to a Peruvian mother who has competed on behalf of Peru since 2010. He has competed since 2009 in a variety of alpine skiing events, including the slalom, giant slalom, downhill, and super combined, at a number of junior international competitions. As of February, 2010, his best finish in any of these competitions was 32nd, at a downhill event in Italy. His club is the Association Peruana de Ski. Oettl Reyes was selected at the age of 16 to be one of three members of Peru's delegation to the 2010 Winter Olympics in Vancouver, British Columbia, Canada, the first Peruvian team to participate in the Winter Olympics. His older sister Ornella Oettl Reyes, also an alpine skier, was selected for the team as well. He is scheduled to compete in both the slalom and giant slalom competitions there, although he was not expected to be in serious competition for a medal. His participation on behalf of Peru was questioned by some, as he was not only born in Germany but lives there and is only half-Peruvian. He and his sister were last minute additions to the Olympic roster. They both met the minimum time qualifications for participation, but that participation was questioned as neither had taken part in a World Championship prior to the Olympics. In response to this criticism, the Peruvian Olympic Committee explained that they were in the process of receiving their Peruvian passports when the last World Championships took place, and so could not yet compete on behalf of Peru. The controversy also prompted some commenters to question why the Peruvian government has not done more to identify and develop athletes within the country. However, the practice of smaller countries sending athletes who are technically citizens of those countries but who reside elsewhere to participate in international competitions is not uncommon. Despite the controversy, the pair asked Peruvians to embrace them and their participation on behalf of Peru at the Olympics.

References

1993 births
Living people
Citizens of Peru through descent
Peruvian male alpine skiers
Olympic alpine skiers of Peru
Alpine skiers at the 2010 Winter Olympics
Alpine skiers at the 2014 Winter Olympics
Peruvian people of German descent
German male alpine skiers
German people of Peruvian descent
Sportspeople of Peruvian descent